The Homeland Fighter's Party (Jawi: ڤرتي ڤجواڠ تانه اير‎‎, PEJUANG) is a Malay-based political party of Malaysia, formed in August 2020 by the former Prime Minister of Malaysia, Mahathir Mohamad in opposition to the ruling Perikatan Nasional and Barisan Nasional government led by the then-Prime Minister and president of the Malaysian United Indigenous Party, Tan Sri Muhyiddin Yassin.

The logo of PEJUANG party consists of a stylised Jawi letter, ڤ (P), which is the first letter in the word "Pejuang".

History 
The party was formed by former Prime Minister Mahathir Mohamad, who was also the former Chairman of the Malaysian United Indigenous Party. He resigned as Prime Minister on 24 February 2020, the same day BERSATU announced its departure from the then ruling Pakatan Harapan coalition. In March, Muhyiddin Yassin, the President and the acting Chairman of BERSATU was appointed the new Prime Minister. However, Mahathir and five other MPs including former Menteri Besar of Kedah Mukhriz Mahathir, former Minister of Education Maszlee Malik, and former Minister of Youth and Sports Syed Saddiq did not support Muhyiddin and the new Perikatan Nasional (PN) government, for which they would be expelled from BERSATU in May. They were later joined by Shahruddin Md Salleh, who resigned as Deputy Minister of Works only three months after his appointment while recanting his support for Muhyiddin.

In August, Mahathir announced that he would be forming a new Malay-based party. On 12 August, it adopted the name Parti Pejuang Tanah Air, with Mahathir and four of the five expelled BERSATU MPs as founding members. The party made its debut in the Slim by-election on 29 August, but its candidate Amir Khusyairi lost to the Barisan Nasional's Mohd Zaidi Aziz. On 21 August, Syed Saddiq, the only former BERSATU MP not to have participated in PEJUANG's founding announced that he would instead form a new party, Malaysian United Democratic Alliance (MUDA). On 2 November, Mazlee announced his resignation as a member of PEJUANG only three months after its founding to become an independent MP. He would later join Parti Keadilan Rakyat (PKR).

In January 2021, the Registrar of Societies (RoS) rejected the party's application for registration. The RoS' decision was appealed by the party but left unresolved for 5 and a half months. On 25 June, the High Court ordered the Home Minister to make a decision regarding the registration of PEJUANG within 14 days and on 8 July 2021, PEJUANG was finally registered as a political party.

On 16 April 2021, PEJUANG Deputy-President Marzuki Yahya said if Pejuang were to work with PN, it would only be done in the interest of the country.

On 22 January 2022, Johor PEJUANG chief, Dr Shahruddin Mohd Salleh, announced that the party would be contesting in the 2022 Johor state election alone, but remained open to the possibility of co-operating with other parties. PEJUANG contested in 42 of the state's 56 seats and failing to win any of them. Party president Mukhriz Mahathir blamed the lack of exposure of the party's logo as one of the reasons for their defeat.

In the 2022 election, PEJUANG contested for 158 out of 222 seats, but no one was elected. Mahathir, the party Chairman, as well as the party's MP for Langkawi, not only failed to get elected but lost deposit. This fate also befalls on 2 other MPs for PEJUANG, namely Mukhriz (MP for Jerlun) and Amiruddin (MP for Kubang Pasu).

On 11 December 2022, PEJUANG Youth Leader Abu Hafiz Salleh Hudin announced his resignation. He said the decision was made after taking into account various considerations including a sense of responsibility towards the party's performance in GE15.

On 16 December 2022, PEJUANG Chairman Mahathir Mohamad resign.

On 20 December 2022, Federal Territory PEJUANG chief and party’s Executive Council Khairuddin Abu Hassan resign. He said he decided to take this action following Tun Dr Mahathir Mohamad’s resignation as PEJUANG chairman.

On 14 January 2023, PEJUANG left GTA. PEJUANG President Mukhriz Mahathir said PEJUANG need focus on strengthening the party before adding value to any coalition. The decision was made after taking into account the views of the representatives in the second PEJUANG General Assembly, following the party's heavy defeat in the past 15th General Election (GE15). However, Mukhriz said PEJUANG took the stance of remaining open to hold any negotiations with any existing political coalition in the run-up to the State Election (PRN) which is expected to take place this year.

On 10 February 2023, Mahathir Mohamad left PEJUANG along with PEJUANG Deputy-President Marzuki Yahya and 11 other PEJUANG members. They took that decision after PEJUANG acted out of Gerakan Tanah Air (GTA).

On 16 February 2023, PEJUANG lost one of its only five MLAs with its Selangor State Chairman Harumaini Omar losing his Selangor Batang Kali state seat after Speaker Ng Suee Lim vacated his seat over his absence in the legislative assembly for six months.

On 2 March 2023, PEJUANG President Mukhriz Mahathir announced that he had sent Perikatan Nasional (PN) Chairman Muhyiddin Yassin on 1 March 2023 to apply for joining PN as its component party and hoped to receive a positive reply.

List of leaders 
Chairman

President

Leadership structure 

 Chairman:
 Vacant
 President:
 Mukhriz Mahathir
 Deputy President:
 Vacant
 Women's Chief (Pejuanita):
 Che Asmah Ibrahim
 Youth's Chief (Pejuang Muda):
 Fikri Ahmad
 Women's Youth Chief (Pejuanita Muda):
 Nurul Ashikin Mabahwi
 Secretary-General:
 Amiruddin Hamzah
 Treasurer:
 Jamil Bidin
 Information Director:
 Rafique Rashid Ali
 Welfare Board Chairman:
 
 Legal Board Chairman:
 Mior Nor Haidir Suhaimi
 Economic Affairs Board Chairman:
 
 National Unity Board Chairman:
 
 NGO Board Chairman:
 Amir Khusyairi Mohamad Tanusi

 Central Executive Council members:
 Mior Nor Haidir Suhaimi
 Amir Khusyairi Mohamad Tanusi
 Ruslin Hasan
 Sazmi Miah
 Tariq Ismail
 Sallehuddin Amiruddin
 Ulya Aqamah Husamudin
 Mohd Akmal Mohd Yusoff
 Nur Amalina Izzati Tajuddin
 State chairman:
 Wilayah Persekutuan: Kamal Abdul Aziz 
 Johor: Nornekman Osman
 Kedah: Azimi Daim
 Kelantan: Sazmi Miah
 Malacca: Sheikh Ikhzan Sheikh Salleh
 Negeri Sembilan: Norizan Ahmad
 Pahang: Hamzah Jaafar
 Perak: Mior Nor Haidir Suhaimi
 Perlis: Rosley Mat
 Penang: Muzaimi Ezrin Mukhtar
 Sabah: Nicholas Sylvester
 Selangor: Harumaini Omar
 Terengganu: Vacant

Members of Parliament

Dewan Negara (Senate)

Senators

Dewan Rakyat (House of Representatives)

Members of Parliament of the 15th Malaysian Parliament 

The party is unrepresented at Dewan Rakyat.

Dewan Undangan Negeri (State Legislative Assembly)

Malaysian State Assembly Representatives 

Kedah State Legislative Assembly
Selangor State Legislative Assembly

General Election results

State election results

See also 
 Politics of Malaysia
 List of political parties in Malaysia

References 

Political parties in Malaysia
Political parties established in 2020
Islamic political parties in Malaysia
Malaysian nationalism